Stittocapsus is a genus of plant bugs in the family Miridae. There are at least three described species in Stittocapsus.

Species
These three species belong to the genus Stittocapsus:
 Stittocapsus franseriae Knight, 1942
 Stittocapsus incaicus Carvalho, 1976
 Stittocapsus mexicanus Carvalho, 1974

References

Further reading

 
 
 

Mirinae
Articles created by Qbugbot